Craig R. Stecyk III (born 1950) is an American artist, writer, photojournalist, and filmmaker who has documented and influenced the surf, skate, and snowboarding cultures.

Biography  
A Southern California native, Stecyk is known for his photographs of the 1970s and '80s, and for documenting surfing and skateboarding culture, including articles for Skateboarder Magazine in the mid-1970s describing the innovative developments of the Z-Boys skateboarding team.

In 1972, Jeff Ho, Skip Engblom, and Stecyk opened a surf shop called Jeff Ho and Zephyr Surfboard Productions in Santa Monica, California.

Stecyk co-wrote the 2001 award-winning documentary Dogtown and Z-Boys with Stacy Peralta. Pablo Schreiber plays Stecyk in the 2005 film Lords of Dogtown.

He co-wrote the book Dogtown and Z-Boys with Glen E. Friedman, published in 2019.

Publications
 Dogtown – The Legend of the Z-Boys, C.R. Stecyk III & Glen E. Friedman, Burning Flags Press, 2000,

References

External links
 

American artists
American non-fiction writers
Writers from Santa Monica, California
Place of birth missing (living people)
American skateboarders
Skate photographers
1950 births
Living people
Artist skateboarders